Payment of Existence is the third studio album by the Norwegian progressive/power metal band Communic.

Track listing

Personnel
Communic
 Oddleif Stensland – lead vocals, lead guitar, rhythm guitar
 Erik Mortensen – bass
 Tor Atle Andersen – drums

Production
 Recorded, mixed, and mastered by Jacob Hansen at Hansen Studios, Denmark.

Technical information
Artwork by Jan Yrlund of Darkgrove Design.

External links
 Interview with Oddleif about the album

References

2008 albums
Communic albums
Albums produced by Jacob Hansen